Athy Rugby Football Club is a community-based rugby club fielding three senior men's teams, a senior ladies' team and underage teams from U7 to U19. Athy RFC was founded in 1880 and plays its home games at The Showgrounds, Athy, County Kildare. The club plays in Division 1B of the Leinster League.

See also
 Leinster Rugby
 IRFU

External links
 Athy Rugby Club

Irish rugby union teams
Rugby clubs established in 1880
Rugby union clubs in County Kildare
Athy